Nauchene Nunatak (‘Nunatak Nauchene’ \'nu-na-tak na-'u-che-ne\) is the mostly ice-covered rocky ridge extending 1.2 km in northwest-southeast direction, 600 m wide and rising to 1163 m in lower Rickmers Glacier in the west foothills of Bruce Plateau on Graham Coast in Graham Land, Antarctica.  It is named after the settlement of Nauchene in Southeastern Bulgaria.

Location
British mapping in 1976.

Maps
 Antarctic Digital Database (ADD). Scale 1:250000 topographic map of Antarctica. Scientific Committee on Antarctic Research (SCAR). Since 1993, regularly upgraded and updated.
British Antarctic Territory. Scale 1:200000 topographic map. DOS 610 Series, Sheet W 66 64. Directorate of Overseas Surveys, Tolworth, UK, 1976.

Notes

References
 Bulgarian Antarctic Gazetteer. Antarctic Place-names Commission. (details in Bulgarian, basic data in English)
 Nauchene Nunatak. SCAR Composite Antarctic Gazetteer

External links
 Nauchene Nunatak. Copernix satellite image

Nunataks of Graham Land
Bulgaria and the Antarctic
Graham Coast